Gabdyukovo (Ğäbdök) is a rural locality (a selo) in Zuyakovsky Selsoviet, Beloretsky District, Bashkortostan, Russia. The population was 558 as of 2010. There are 5 streets.

Geography 
Gabdyukovo is located 139 km northwest of Beloretsk (the district's administrative centre) by road. Karagay is the nearest rural locality.

References 

Rural localities in Beloretsky District